Shanntol Ince (born 10 April 1995) is a Trinidad and Tobago Paralympic swimmer who competes in international elite events. She is a double Parapan American Games bronze medalist and has competed at the Paralympic Games twice in 2012 and 2016. She was born with her right leg shorter than her left leg.

References

1995 births
Living people
Paralympic swimmers of Trinidad and Tobago
Swimmers at the 2012 Summer Paralympics
Swimmers at the 2016 Summer Paralympics
Swimmers at the 2010 Commonwealth Games
Medalists at the 2011 Parapan American Games
Trinidad and Tobago female freestyle swimmers
S9-classified Paralympic swimmers